Peñamellera Alta (in asturian: El Valle Altu de Peñamellera) is a municipality in the Autonomous Community of the Principality of Asturias, Spain. It is bordered on the north by Llanes, on the west by Cabrales, on the east by Peñamellera Baja and on the south by the Autonomous Community of Cantabria.

Parishes

Main sights
Ruins of the church of San Pedro de Plecín
Parish church of San Pedro, in Alles

Gastronomy
One of the most famous products of the municipality is the Peñamellera cheese. It is the heir to a long tradition of artisanship. Despite the fact that it was near the point of disappearing, it has grown in recent years due to the establishment of a cooperative to produce it.

Another famous food from the region is the salmon from the Cares River. The honey of Peñamellera, used in desserts, deserves mention also.

The traditional drink of the municipality, like the rest of the principality, is cider.

References

External links
Federación Asturiana de Concejos 

Municipalities in Asturias